The Aycock Birthplace, also known as the Charles B. Aycock Birthplace, is a historic home in Wayne County, North Carolina, and a historic site belonging to the North Carolina Department of Natural and Cultural Resources' Historic Sites division.  The property was the location of the birth of Governor Charles Brantley Aycock in 1859, and exhibits at the historic site serve to tell the story of the Governor's political career and the education reforms he enacted while in office. It was built about 1840, and is a one-story weatherboard dwelling on a brick pier foundation.  It has a gable roof and exterior end chimneys.

It was listed on the National Register of Historic Places in 1970.

References

External links
 Aycock Birthplace - NC Historic Sites

Houses on the National Register of Historic Places in North Carolina
Houses completed in 1840
Museums in Wayne County, North Carolina
Historic house museums in North Carolina
Museums established in 1970
North Carolina State Historic Sites
Protected areas of Wayne County, North Carolina
1970 establishments in North Carolina
National Register of Historic Places in Wayne County, North Carolina
Houses in Wayne County, North Carolina
Former state parks of North Carolina
Aycock, Charles B
Governor of North Carolina